Wayne Township is one of the twenty-two townships of Tuscarawas County, Ohio, United States.  The 2000 census found 1,743 people in the township.

Geography
Located in the northwestern corner part of the county, it borders the following townships:
Sugar Creek Township, Stark County - north
Franklin Township - east
Sugar Creek Township - south
Walnut Creek Township, Holmes County - southwest
Paint Township, Holmes County - northwest

No municipalities are located in Wayne Township, although the unincorporated community of Dundee lies at the center of the township.

Name and history
It is one of twenty Wayne Townships statewide.

Wayne Township was organized in 1810.

Government
The township is governed by a three-member board of trustees, who are elected in November of odd-numbered years to a four-year term beginning on the following January 1. Two are elected in the year after the presidential election and one is elected in the year before it. There is also an elected township fiscal officer, who serves a four-year term beginning on April 1 of the year after the election, which is held in November of the year before the presidential election. Vacancies in the fiscal officership or on the board of trustees are filled by the remaining trustees.  The current trustees are Quentin Schwartz, Dan Silvius, and Fred Snyder, and the fiscal officer is Susan Stein.

References

External links
County website

Townships in Tuscarawas County, Ohio
Townships in Ohio